Kankite is a mineral with the chemical formula Fe3+AsO4·3.5(H2O). Kankite is named for the locality that yielded first specimens Kaňk, Czech Republic.  Kankite forms in old (1200- to 1400-year-old) mine dumps.  It is yellowish-green on fresh exposure, with a paler greenish yellow on exposure to air.

Properties
Kankite is a monoclinic mineral, meaning it is a mineral system having 3 unequal axes of which one is at right angles with the other two. It has an uneven fracture and has a hardness of 2–3 (gypsum–calcite). It is translucent yellowish green in color with a grayish-yellow streak. Its luster is dull to vitreous. Kankite contains the elements arsenic, iron, hydrogen and oxygen. It was approved by the IMA in 1976. Its habit is botryoidal, "grape-like" rounded forms (e.g. malachite). It forms encrustations, crust-like aggregates on matrix.  The specific gravity of Kankite is 2.70.

Occurrences
Kankite was first described in 1976 for an occurrence in the Kaňk, Kutná Hora, Bohemia, Czech Republic.  It is a rare secondary mineral in highly weathered mine dumps containing arsenopyrite (in the Czech Republic). It occurs in association with scorodite, pitticite, parascorodite, zykaite, arsenopyrite, vajdakite, native arsenic, pyrite, proustite, gypsum, “limonite” and quartz.

It has also been reported from  Munzig near Meissen; from Brand-Erbisdorf, Saxony; from Menzenschwand, Black Forest in Germany. It occurs at King's Wood mine, Buckfastleigh, Devon, and from the South Terras mine, St. Stephen-in-Brannel, Cornwall in England. It has also been reported from the Suzukura mine north-northeast of Enzan, Yamanashi Prefecture, Japan.

References

Iron(III) minerals
Arsenate minerals
Monoclinic minerals